Noel Acciari (born December 1, 1991) is an American professional ice hockey center for the Toronto Maple Leafs of the National Hockey League (NHL). He is nicknamed 'Cookie'.

Playing career

Amateur
As a youth, Acciari played in the 2004 Quebec International Pee-Wee Hockey Tournament with a minor ice hockey team from South Shore.

Acciari attended Bishop Hendricken High School in Warwick, Rhode Island, where he won the state championship in his freshman year. He helped Hendricken defeat Mount St. Charles academy in the finals being played at Providence College. He was also the captain of the Kent School team in Kent, Connecticut, and graduated from there in 2011.

Prior to turning professional, Acciari attended Providence College, where he played three seasons of NCAA Division I hockey with the Providence Friars, registering 32 goals, 33 assists, 65 points and 72 penalty minutes in 113 games. In his senior year Acciari helped his team capture their first 2015 NCAA National Championship, and his outstanding play was recognized when he was named Hockey East's Best Defensive Forward.

Professional

Boston Bruins
On June 8, 2015, the Boston Bruins of the National Hockey League (NHL) signed Acciari to a two-year entry-level contract. In the midst of the 2015–16 season, on March 1, 2016, Acciari was called up to the Bruins for the first time as a professional. He made his NHL debut that night in a home game against the Calgary Flames. It would not be until March 28, 2017, that Acciari would score his first NHL goal in a home game against the Nashville Predators; Acciari scored the third Bruins goal en route to a 4–1 regulation-time Bruins win. On June 28, 2017, Acciari signed a two-year contract extension with Boston.

Florida Panthers
As an unrestricted free agent, Acciari signed a three-year, $5 million contract with the Florida Panthers on July 1, 2019. Following the signing, Panthers General Manager Dale Tallon praised Acciari's versatile play and physicality, saying: "This guy's going to make people accountable, and make our own players accountable as well. He's a versatile player. He will take some of the burden away from others by taking D-zone faceoffs, killing penalties and playing that physical role. He gives our fourth line a little more spirit and passion." However, he was unable to ever play a complete 82 regular-season with the Panthers due to the COVID-19 pandemic. In his first season, he tallied a career-best 20 goals and 27 points through 66 games.

St. Louis Blues and Toronto Maple Leafs
Following the conclusion of his contract with the Panthers, Acciari left as a free agent to sign a one-year, $1.25 million contract with the St. Louis Blues on July 13, 2022. He skated in 54 games for the Blues during the 2022–23 season, recording 10 goals and eight assists.

On February 17, 2023, Acciari and Ryan O'Reilly were traded by the Blues to the Toronto Maple Leafs in a three-team trade also involving the Minnesota Wild.

Personal life
Acciari was born to parents Michael and Edna Acciari and grew up the middle child of three brothers.

Acciari married his fiancée Kaitlyn Chisholm on July 14, 2018, in Rhode Island.

Career statistics

Awards and honors

References

External links
 

1991 births
Living people
American men's ice hockey centers
Bishop Hendricken High School alumni
Boston Bruins players
Charlotte Checkers (2010–) players
Florida Panthers players
Ice hockey players from Rhode Island
Kent School alumni
People from Johnston, Rhode Island
Providence Bruins players
Providence Friars men's ice hockey players
St. Louis Blues players
Toronto Maple Leafs players
Undrafted National Hockey League players